Florens van der Spek (born 1992) is a Dutch politician. He is leader of the political party Jesus Lives (Dutch: Jezus Leeft). His father in law, Joop van Ooijen, is the founder of the party.

Van der Spek lives on his father-in-law’s farm. During his youth, he was a cocaine addict as well as an alcoholic. Now his party campaigns to outlaw all drugs. When he went to church, he would leave early to visit the pub were he took drugs and drank alcohol, also being frequently involved in fights. When asked about what he would do if he became minister-president he described himself as unfit as his strict interpretation of the Bible wouldn't allow him to make the necessary concessions. He went as far as to say that his party would not cooperate with parties that "oppose the principles of Jesus" at all. He is of the opinion that every problem can be solved by "doing them with Jesus", traffic jams being the exception. He also was a candidate for the European Election.

He works at a gardening company called Scheppingsonderhoud.''

When his party won zero seats in the election he remarked that meant he didn't have to make a compromise with other politicians and that was the only true victory, as his goal is not to win elections but to share Jesus' message.

Florens van der Spek lives in Giessenburg.

References

External links 
 www.florensvanderspek.nl

1992 births
Living people
21st-century Dutch politicians
Dutch Protestants
Leaders of political parties in the Netherlands
People from Molenlanden